
Zambrów County is a unit of territorial administration and local government (powiat) in Podlaskie Voivodeship, north-eastern Poland. It came into being on January 1, 1999, as a result of the Polish local government reforms passed in 1998.

As of 2019 its total population is 43,663, out of which the population of Zambrów is 22,098 and the rural population is 21,565.

Neighbouring counties
Zambrów County is bordered by Łomża County to the north, Białystok County and Wysokie Mazowieckie County to the east, and Ostrów Mazowiecka County to the south-west.

Administrative division
The county is subdivided into five gminas (one urban and four rural). These are listed in the following table, in descending order of population.

References

 
Land counties of Podlaskie Voivodeship